LAstronomie is a monthly astronomy magazine published by the Société astronomique de France (SAF). Sylvain Bouley, the president of SAF, is the publication director and astronomer Fabrice Mottez is the editor-in-chief.

History

The magazine was established by Camille Flammarion and the first issue, dated 1882, was published on January 1, 1883. After SAF was founded in 1887, a second journal was created, called the Bulletin mensuel de la Société Astronomique de France. The two publications existed in parallel up to 1894. In the December 1894 issue, Flammarion announced in an editorial that LAstronomie would cease to exist. From January 1895 to December 1910, only the Bulletin de la Société Astronomique de France was published. Starting from 1912, the Bulletin was renamed LAstronomie, while preserving the volume numbering of the Bulletin.

Distribution 
The magazine is available by subscription both in France and internationally in hard copy and digital formats. It is also sold in newspaper kiosks and magazine stands in France, Belgium, Luxembourg, Switzerland and Morocco. 

Electronic versions of L'Astronomie and Bulletin de la Société astronomique de France from 1882 to 1945 are available from the Bibliothèque nationale de France's Gallica website.

References

External links 
L'Astronomie official website
L'Astronomie, revue mensuelle d'astronomie populaire (1882-1894) on Gallica
Bulletin de la Société astronomique de France (1887–1910) on Gallica
L'Astronomie : revue mensuelle d'astronomie, de météorologie et de physique du globe et bulletin de la Société astronomique de France (1911-1945) on Gallica
 Astrophysics Data System (ADS) provides scanned articles of Bulletin de la Société astronomique de France and L'Astronomie (1882–1988), and abstracts or citations (1989-present) using publication code LAstr.

1883 establishments in France
Amateur astronomy
Astronomy magazines
French-language magazines
Monthly magazines published in France
Magazines established in 1883
Magazines published in Paris